Eli Bush is an American film and theatre producer and former executive at Scott Rudin Productions. He is best known for producing the film Lady Bird, for which he co-won the 2018 Golden Globe Award for Best Picture - Musical or Comedy and was co-nominated for the Academy Award for Best Picture.
He is married to Marie Louise Khondji daughter of Darius Khondji since October 2022.

Biography 
Bush graduated from Columbia College of Columbia University in 2009.

During his tenure working for Scott Rudin Productions, he and Rudin worked on a number of critically acclaimed movies, including Uncut Gems (2019), Annihilation (2018), Eighth Grade (2018), Lady Bird (2017), and The Girl with the Dragon Tattoo (2011). On Broadway, he won four Tony Awards for Best Revival of a Play: for Death of a Salesman (2012), A Raisin in the Sun (2014), Skylight (2015), and A View from the Bridge (2016). He also won the Tony Award for Best Musical in 2017 for Hello, Dolly! as well as the Tony Award for Best Play in 2016 for producing The Humans. He was nominated for the 2017 Primetime Emmy Award for Outstanding Children's Program for co-producing School of Rock.

In April 2021 stories in The Hollywood Reporter and "Vulture"alleged numerous instances of abuse from Rudin towards employees, including physical violence. Following the allegations, Rudin announced that he would be "stepping back" to "work on personal issues I should have long ago." The Vulture story reported that Bush had left Scott Rudin Productions the previous week.

In 2022 Bush executive produced Jerrod Carmichael's stand-up special Rothaniel on HBO. The special was subsequently nominated  for a Primetime Emmy for Outstanding Directing For A Variety Special and Outstanding Writing For A Variety Special.

In October 2022 Bush produced Kate Berlant’s one-woman show at the Connelly Theater. It was directed by Bo Burnham and marked Berlant's return after more than a decade.

Filmography
He was a producer in all films unless otherwise noted.

Film

Thanks

Television

Miscellaneous crew

Theater

References

External links
 

Living people
American film producers
American theatre managers and producers
Year of birth missing (living people)
Columbia College (New York) alumni
Golden Globe Award-winning producers